The Wivenhoe Dam is a rock and earth-fill embankment dam with a concrete spillway across the Brisbane River in South East Queensland, Australia. The primary purpose of the dam is the supply of potable water for the Brisbane and Ipswich regions. The dam also provides for flood mitigation control, hydroelectricity, and recreation. The impounded reservoir is called Lake Wivenhoe and the dam, the lake and a narrow strip of surrounding land forms a locality also called Lake Wivenhoe.

Wivenhoe Dam was planned in the early 1970s. The 1974 Brisbane flood highlighted the need for flood protection for South East Queensland. The lake also forms part of the water storages for the Wivenhoe Power Station.

Location and features
The  dam wall holds back the  reservoir when at full capacity. The dam also has an auxiliary spillway to stop over-topping. The dam is managed by SEQ Water since July 2008 when most dam assets were transferred to the statutory authority, as part of a water security project in the South East Queensland region, known as the South East Queensland Water Grid.

Construction

Wivenhoe was initially investigated for a dam site in the 1890s and again in 1933. Further investigations into a dam began in the mid 1960s. In November 1971, Government approval was given to proceed with construction. Acquisition of lands of the submerged portion of the dam began in March 1973. In 1976, the Government gave approval to proceed with construction of the pumped storage hydro-electric scheme. Total cost for the hydro-electric project was A$450 million. In March 1977, the first construction contract was awarded. The dam was designed by the Queensland Water Resources Commission.

In June 1983, the partially completed dam mitigated a potentially severe flood that may have caused damage equal to the 1893 Brisbane flood. Construction work, carried out by Thiess Brothers, was complete by 1985. The dam holds twice as much water as Sydney Harbour and can hold about seven times more water than the Hinze Dam on the Gold Coast. Wivenhoe Dam contributes to the Gold Coast's water supply.

Purpose

The dam was designed as a response to the floods that damaged Brisbane in 1974. Built in the late 1970s – early 1980s as a multifunction facility by a consortium of construction companies including Thiess Brothers, Wivenhoe Dam provides a safe water supply to the people of Brisbane and adjacent regions. Additionally, Wivenhoe Dam serves as the lower storage in a pumped-storage, hydro-electric generating facility, the Wivenhoe Power Station. Under normal conditions the dam supplies water via pipeline to both Tarong Power Station and Tarong North Power Station, but during drought conditions only supplies water to Tarong North.

Flood mitigation

During a flood the dam is designed to hold back  of additional water for flood mitigation or 225% capacity. Under the water release plan which is defined by law, excess water must be released from the dam within seven days or a week of it reaching 100% capacity. In February 1999, the level reached 135% of full capacity. In 2007, a feasibility study concluded that Wivenhoe Dam failed to satisfy the Australian National Committee on Large Dams (ANCOLD) guidelines on acceptable flood capacity.

2000-2007 Drought
Brisbane water levels reduced to under 20% of capacity, having had no substantial inflow for five years.

2011 Queensland floods

The largest ever recorded inflows for the dam occurred in January 2011. On 11 January 2011, Wivenhoe Dam reached its highest level ever, 191% of normal water supply storage capacity, as it held back floodwater. Because it is an embankment dam, it was not designed to spill over its crest or overtop and there is a risk that if waters spilled over the crest, this could erode the dam wall and potentially cause the dam to fail. In this scenario the water level would need to rise to 225% capacity. To prevent this, the dam was designed and built to include a second emergency spillway.

2022 eastern Australia floods

Wivenhoe Dam reaches a 180% capacity as of 27 February 2022

Recycled water

In 2006, emergency plans for placing fully treated recycled water from the Western Corridor Recycled Water Scheme into the dam to supplement supply were made public. Sixty million litres of recycled water were to be pumped into the dam by early 2009. Increasing rainfall from 2008 resulted in the plan for recycled water to enter the region's drinking water supply to be postponed.

Recreation
Lake Wivenhoe is also a camping and outdoor recreation destination. Camping sites are provided at Captain Logan and Lumley Hill Areas. The managed camping facilities at Captain Logan Camp include hot showers, barbecues and toilets, and are adjacent to playgrounds and a boat ramp at Logan Inlet. Cormorant Bay, Hamon Cove and Spillway Common also have facilities for picnic.

A stocked impoundment permit is required to fish in the dam. Swimming is permitted and camp sites have been established. Electric and non-powered boating with a permit is allowed, but domestic animals are banned.

Fauna
The dam is home to the endangered Australian lungfish. Anne Kemp, a researcher from the University of Queensland, estimates there was a population of 800 in 2010 but many are swept out of the dam when the spillway is opened and that their food source of molluscs and clams is insufficient to maintain the lungfish in the dam.

Self-sustaining populations of lungfish have lived in dams in South East Queensland for over 100 years since 1896. Lungfish were originally restricted to the Mary and Burnett river systems but due to perceived threats to their survival they were introduced to other rivers and dams, including the Brisbane River, in 1895–1896.
This was done to improve the viability of the species.

Land around the dam has been the location for a tree planting program in order to provide koala habitat.  Planting will occur between 2020 and 2025.

See also

 Bridges over the Brisbane River
 List of dams in Queensland

References

External links

 Lake Wivenhoe fishing information & map
 SEQWater – Wivenhoe Dam

Wivenhoe, Lake
Brisbane River
Bridges over the Brisbane River
Floods in Queensland
Buildings and structures in Somerset Region
Dams in Queensland
1984 establishments in Australia
Dams completed in 1984
Rock-filled dams
Earth-filled dams
Embankment dams
Articles containing video clips